Kim Soo-ro (born Kim Sang-joong on May 7, 1970) is a South Korean actor.

Career

Early career 
Kim Soo-ro studied Theater at the Seoul Institute of the Arts and Dongguk University, then joined the Mokwha Repertory Company. In 1993, he made his cinematic debut with a minor role in Two Cops, and became known for being a scene-stealing supporting actor, especially in comedies such as The Foul King, Hi! Dharma!, Fun Movie and S Diary.

With Vampire Cop Ricky in 2006, Kim began starring in leading roles, and this was followed by the films A Bold Family, Our School's E.T., Death Bell 2: Bloody Camp, The Quiz Show Scandal, Romantic Heaven, and Ghost Sweepers. He also appeared in the television series Master of Study and A Gentleman's Dignity.

Kim Soo-ro’s Project 
In 2009, it was The Lower Depths, a play by Maxim Gorky considered to be one of the most important works of Russian Socialist realism, that drew Kim back to the theater. Kim made his first foray into producing plays with Lee Gi-dong Gymnasium in 2010 (which he also starred in), and its commercial success led him to establish the Kim Su-ro Project in 2011, which aims to produce original works by local playwrights. His first production, Audacious Romance starring Lee Hyun-jin, was a hit and laid the foundation for succeeding productions such as Love Generation, and the musicals Coffee Prince, Black Mary Poppins, and Agatha. Kim starred in another restaging of The Lower Depths in 2014, which is his company's ninth production.

Filmography

Film

Television series

Variety show

Theater

Awards and nominations

References

External links 
  
 Kim Su-ro at S.M. Culture & Contents 
 
 
 

South Korean male film actors
South Korean male television actors
South Korean male stage actors
IHQ (company) artists
Dongguk University alumni
1970 births
Living people
People from Anseong
Gwangsan Kim clan